Events from the year 1794 in Canada.

Incumbents
Monarch: George III

Federal government
Parliament of Lower Canada — 1st
Parliament of Upper Canada — 1st

Governors
Governor of the Canadas: Guy Carleton, 1st Baron Dorchester
Governor of New Brunswick: Thomas Carleton
Governor of Nova Scotia: John Wentworth
Commodore-Governor of Newfoundland: John Elliot
Governor of St. John's Island: Edmund Fanning
Governor of Upper Canada: John Graves Simcoe

Events
1794 – Baranov builds first vessel in northwestern America at Voskres-senski on Kenai.
Jay Treaty establishes neutral commission to settle border disputes between United States and Canada; restores trade between the United States and British colonies of Canada; also guarantees Indians free movement across the border.
June – Close of a session of the Canadian Legislature, which began in November last. Only six acts have been passed. Public accounts are first published for tax-payers' information.
June 29 – Petition of Free Negroes.

Births
Daniel Tracey, doctor, journalist and politician (died 1832)

Deaths
 March 26 – Juan Francisco de la Bodega y Quadra, naval officer, explorer, administrator (born 1744)

References 

 
Canada
94